, equally known as Sanchōmō by its Sino-Japanese reading, is a tachi (Japanese greatsword) forged during the middle Kamakura period (13th century). The set of the blade and its koshirae (mountings) is a National Treasure of Japan. It was wielded by Uesugi Kagekatsu (1556–1623), a powerful warlord in the Sengoku period, and had been inherited by his clan.

History 
Yamatorige was forged during the middle Kamakura period (13th century).

According to Kanzan Sato, a nihontō (Japanese sword) appraiser and researcher, it was named so in order to honor the beauty of the tachi by likening it to the feather of a copper pheasant or the landscape of sunset mountains. In addition, Suiken Fukunaga, another nihontō appraiser/researcher, cites a theory written in  that the name came from the landscape of a wildfire. Fukunaga himself, however, remarks the wildfire theory is utterly dubious.

The tachi is one of the 35 swords favored by the warlord Uesugi Kagekatsu (1556–1623), an adopted son and the successor of the "God of War" Uesugi Kenshin. Later it had been inherited as one of the greatest heirlooms of the Yonezawa-Uesugi clan, the head of the Uesugi clans.

On March 29, 1952, the tachi was designated a National Treasure of Japan. Its koshirae (mountings) are a part of the designation as accessories to the blade.

In 2020, Setouchi City purchased yamatorige from an individual, which was then housed in the Bizen Osafune Japanese Sword Museum. The purchase cost was about 500 million yen (About $5 million).

List of name variations 

Markus Sesko, a researcher on Japanese swords, calls the sword .

Due to both its ambiguous origin and the highly complex reading system for kanji characters, the sword has a wide variety of associated names.

 Yamatorige - kun'yomi (native reading) for the kanji characters 
 Yamadorige - a variant of native reading
 Sanchōmō - on'yomi (Sino-Japanese reading) for the same characters
 Sanshōmō - by characters written on a wooden plate co-inherited with this tachi
 Yamashōmō

See also
 List of National Treasures of Japan (crafts-swords)

References

Bibliography

Individual Japanese swords
National Treasures of Japan
Uesugi clan